The 71st edition of the Kuurne–Brussels–Kuurne cycling classic was held on 3 March 2019. It was part of the 2019 UCI Europe Tour and ranked as a 1.HC event. It was the second and concluding race of the Belgian opening weekend, the year's first road races in Northwestern Europe, one day after Omloop Het Nieuwsblad.

Teams
Twenty-five teams were invited to start the race. These included seventeen UCI WorldTeams and eight UCI Professional Continental teams.

Results

References

External links

2019
2019 UCI Europe Tour
2019 in Belgian sport